The Chhapra–Mumbai CST Antyodaya Express is a weekly Antyodaya Express, running between  and  via Bhopal, Jhansi, Kanpur and Basti. It is numbered 15102/15101. This train is operated and maintained by North Eastern Railway zone of Indian Railways.

Till 25 April 2019, it was run as the Jan Sadharan Express with ICF Coaches and later 26 April 2019 it's upgraded to LHB coach and runs as the Antyodaya Express.

Coaches
The 15101 / 02 Chhapra Junction–Mumbai CST Antyodaya Express has 23 general unreserved & two SLR (seating with luggage rake) coaches . It does not carry a pantry car.

As is customary with most train services in India, coach composition may be amended at the discretion of Indian Railways depending on demand.

Service

Routing

This train runs via , Bhatni,  to reach Mumbai CST.

Traction
As the route is going to electrification, a Samastipur-based WDM-3D diesel locomotive pulls the train up to  later, an electric locomotive WAP-4 pulls the train to its destination.

References

External links
 15101 Antyodaya Express at India Rail Info
 15102 Antyodaya Express at India Rail Info

Jan Sadharan Express trains
Transport in Mumbai
Transport in Chhapra
Rail transport in Maharashtra
Rail transport in Madhya Pradesh
Rail transport in Uttar Pradesh
Rail transport in Bihar
Antyodaya Express trains